2021 Belarusian First League is the 31st season of 2nd level football in Belarus. It started in April and finished in November 2021.

Team changes from 2020 season
Two best teams of 2020 Belarusian First League (Sputnik Rechitsa and Gomel) were promoted to Belarusian Premier League. They were replaced by two last-placed teams of 2020 Belarusian Premier League (Belshina Bobruisk and Smolevichi). 

FC Smorgon (6th-placed team of last year's season) were additionally promoted to Premier League to replace Gorodeya, who disbanded in the winter. Smorgon were chosen ahead of Krumkachy (who were denied a Premier League license) and two other teams (Arsenal Dzerzhinsk and Lokomotiv Gomel, who did not apply for license due to insufficient financing).

Two best teams of 2020 Belarusian Second League (Dnepr Mogilev and Shakhtyor Petrikov) were promoted to the league.

Despite initial plans to restore 16 teams in the league for the first time since 2017, the league lost several clubs which all withdrew for financial reasons (Smolevichi, Oshmyany, Granit Mikashevichi and Khimik Svetlogorsk). Only one club was additionally promoted from the Second League (Baranovichi), and on 5 April it was decided to go ahead with just 12 teams (lowest in the league's history) in three round-robin system.

Teams summary

League table

Results

Matchdays 1–22

Matchdays 23–33

Promotion play-offs

First leg

Second leg

Slavia won 1–0 on aggregate and therefore both clubs remain in their respective leagues.

Top goalscorers

Updated to games played on 27 November 2021 Source: football.by

See also
2021 Belarusian Premier League
2020–21 Belarusian Cup
2021–22 Belarusian Cup

References

External links
 Official site 

Belarusian First League seasons
2
Belarus
Belarus